"When All Is Said and Done" is a song by ABBA.

When All Is Said and Done may also refer to:

 "When All Is Said and Done", a song by Boyzone from Said and Done
 "When All Is Said and Done", a song by Napalm Death from Smear Campaign
 "When All Is Said and Done", a song by Tyrone Wells
 "When All Is Said and Done", a song by Trapt from Trapt
 When All Is Said and Done, an album by From Satellite